Madurai Tamil (மதுரை தமிழ்), known as Madurai Bashai, is the dialect of Tamil spoken in the region of Madurai and over a vast geographical area of South Tamil Nadu, the area once ruled by the Pandiya kings. It differs substantially from Nellai Tamil, a region which was also part of the Pandiya domain.

Region of Madurai Tamil
  
Madurai
Tirumangalam
Theni
Aruppukottai
Virudunagar
Melur
Usilampatti
Vadipatti

Paramakudi

Dindigul
Theni
Ramanathapuram
Sivagangai
Natham
Chellampatti and 
 Rameshwaram .
The common dialect has made the term Madurai refer to a much larger area than it actually is. It is not uncommon for people from any of the above cities to introduce themselves as people of Madurai.

Words of Madurai Tamil 
  (மறுத) = Madurai
  (வராய்ங்க) = They're coming
  (போராய்ங்க) = They're going
  (அங்கிட்டு) = There
  (இங்கிட்டு) = Here
  (எம்புட்டு) = How much?
  (ராவுறான்) = He is boring
  (வீயாக்கானமா பேசு) = Speak properly
  (குண்டக்க மண்டக்க) = Irrelevant
  (முண்டகலப்ப) = Plough
  (பட்றைய போடு) = Sit and relax
  (கொக்க மக்க) = Collective term for cousin
  (கோலாரா போயிட்டு வா) = Take care
  (பொசகட்ட பய) = Useless fellow
  (சீமை எண்ணை = சீம்மண்ணை) = Kerosene
  (இம்புட்டுகூண்டு) = Very little
  (ரூட்ட குடுக்காத) = Don't tell lies
  (வைய்யபோறாய்ங்க) = They are going to scold
  (பேலாத) = Don't fear
  = Only for that
  (இதுகாண்டிதான்) = Only for this
  (குடிக்காரமட்டை) = Drunkard
  (ஜாரி) = Beautiful woman
  (ஆட்டைய போடு) = Steal, thieve
  (அண்ணே) = Elder Brother
  (எக்கோய்) = Elder Sister
  (போடா ங்கொய்யால) = Get out of my way
  (டுபுக்கு) = Fool (which is derived from kanniyakumari)
  (மண்டகனம்) = Headweight
  (சோலிய பாரு) = Mind your own business
  (லந்து) = Kidding
  (காப்ரா) = Fashionable
  (அலப்பறை) = Fashionable
  (அலும்பு) = Showy, showing pride
  (ஏழரைய கூ்ட்டாத) = Don't create a scene
  (ஆட்டும்) = Okay
  (சூதானமா இரு) = Be careful
  (கொங்கா பய) = Ignorant (derogatory for Kongu)
  (காவாளி) = Waste fellow
  (களவாணி) = Thief
  (வெள்ளனே) = Early morning
  (பைய) = Slow
  (ஒசக்க) = Up
  = Loft
  (ஏணி மரம்) = Ladder

References

Tamil dialects
Culture of Madurai